Raghunathpur Assembly constituency is an assembly constituency in Purulia district in the Indian state of West Bengal. It is reserved for scheduled castes.

Overview
As per orders of the Delimitation Commission, No. 246 Raghunathpur Assembly constituency (SC) is composed of the following: Raghunathpur municipality; Raghunathpur I, Neturia and Santuri community development blocks.

Raghunathpur Assembly constituency is part of No. 36 Bankura (Lok Sabha constituency).

Members of Legislative Assembly

Election results

2021

2016

2011

.# Swing calculated on Congress+Trinamool Congress vote percentages taken together in 2006.

1977-2006
In the 2006 and 2001 state assembly elections, Uma Rani Bouri of CPI(M) won the Raghunathpur assembly seat defeating her nearest rivals, Purna Chandra Bouri of Trinamool Congress and Magaram Bouri of Trinamool Congress respectively. Contests in most years were multi cornered but only winners and runners are being mentioned. Natabar Bagdi of CPI(M) defeated Nabakumar Bouri of Congress in 1996, Gopal Das of Congress in 1991 and 1987, and Durgadas Bauri of Congress in 1982. Bijoy Bauri of SUC defeated Nepal Bauri of Janata Party.

1957-1972
Durgadas Bauri of Congress won in 1972. Hari Pada Bouri of SUC won in 1971 and 1969. N. Bauri of Congress won in 1967. Shankar Narayan Singhadeo of Congress won in 1962. In 1957 Raghunathpur was a joint seat. Shankar Narayan Singhadeo and Nepal Bouri, both of Congress, won in 1957.

References

Assembly constituencies of West Bengal
Politics of Purulia district